"All-American Girl" is a song composed by American country pop singer Carrie Underwood, Ashley Gorley and Kelley Lovelace. It is the second single from Underwood's second studio album, Carnival Ride, released in the United States on December 17, 2007. (See 2007 in country music).

Background
"All-American Girl" is the second single for which Underwood shares a writing credit, the first being "So Small", which preceded it. The song is a mid-tempo country-pop song, with a soaring chorus. Underwood stated in an issue of Entertainment Weekly that the high note during the bridge in the song is the highest note she has ever hit (E5, or the E an octave above middle E).

Content
The song centers around a "beautiful, wonderful, perfect all-American girl." The first verse tells the story of a father hoping for a baby boy to continue his legacy, but "when the nurse came in with a little pink blanket, all those big dreams changed". The baby girl has her father "wrapped around her finger", and his heart belongs to that "all-American girl." The second verse shifts to 16 years later when the girl is now a teenager who falls head-over-heels for the "senior football star." Just as with the girl's father, she becomes the center of the boy's world. The final bridge describes the girl and boy getting married and expecting "one of their own". When she asks the boy what he's hoping for he replies with "one just like you": an "all-American girl." Underwood said the song is partially autobiographical.

She wrote the song loosely based on the fact that she is the youngest of a family of three daughters, and ended up marrying a sports star (albeit in hockey). Underwood has worked as a vet and a waitress, entered pageants and was also a Sigma Sigma Sigma sorority member, all activities depicted in the music video.

Music video 
The music video, which premiered January 23, 2008, was another of Underwood's many videos directed by Roman White.

The video features several different scenes of Underwood in different outfits portraying what an All-American girl could be behind different backgrounds through a green screen.

Throughout the video she appeared as an American Olympic swimmer, an artist/painter, a nurse, a photographer, a cowgirl, a waitress, a ballerina, a clothing designer, a chef, a cheerleader, a veterinarian, a beauty queen, a mother, a football player, a police officer, a teacher, a graduate, a college student (wearing a sweatshirt from Underwood's own sorority Sigma Sigma Sigma), a bride, a flight attendant, a news anchor, an astronaut, a firefighter, a soldier, a surgeon, a welder, a scientific chemist, a car thief and the President of the United States. In one scene, in a reference to Underwood's video for "Before He Cheats", she wears the same black leather jacket and sunglasses while holding a baseball bat, with the same smashed red pickup truck in the background (whenever the newswoman is shown, along the bottom screen can be seen a scrolling news track regarding the truck destruction). Underwood is also shown performing in a green zip-up hoodie, jeans, and black pumps in an orange room.

Sales and certifications
As of 2015, "All-American Girl" sold 1,800,000 copies in the United States. The song has been certified 2× Platinum by the RIAA.

Chart performance
The song reached number 27 on the Hot 100, becoming Underwood's seventh career Hot 100 top 40 single. "All-American Girl" debuted at number 58 on the country charts and has reached number one on Hot Country Songs and spent two weeks at the top, making it Underwood's fourth consecutive number one on that chart and fifth overall, her sixth consecutive number one country single overall, and her seventh number one single altogether. It is her first number one to spend less than three weeks at the top of the chart.

Year-end charts

Awards

2008 CMT Online Awards

|-
| style="text-align:center;"|2008 || style="text-align:center;"| "All-American Girl" || style="text-align:center;"| Most-Streamed Country Song of the Year ||

2008 BMI Awards

|-
| style="text-align:center;"|2008 || style="text-align:center;"| "All-American Girl" || style="text-align:center;"| Songwriter of the Year (Carrie Underwood) ||

2010 CMA Triple Play Awards

|-
| style="text-align:center;"|2010 || style="text-align:center;"| "All-American Girl" || style="text-align:center;"| Triple-Play Songwriter (along with "So Small", "Last Name") ||

References 

2007 singles
2007 songs
Carrie Underwood songs
Music videos directed by Roman White
Songs written by Carrie Underwood
Songs written by Ashley Gorley
Songs written by Kelley Lovelace
Arista Nashville singles
Song recordings produced by Mark Bright (record producer)